Article-level metrics are citation metrics which measure the usage and impact of individual scholarly articles.

Adoption
Traditionally, bibliometrics have been used to evaluate the usage and impact of research, but have usually been focused on journal-level metrics such as the impact factor or researcher-level metrics such as the h-index. Article-level metrics, on the other hand, may demonstrate the impact of an individual article. This is related to, but distinct from, altmetrics.

Starting in March 2009, the Public Library of Science introduced article-level metrics for all articles.
The open access publisher PLOS provides article level metrics for all of its journals including downloads, citations, and altmetrics. In March 2014 it was announced that COUNTER statistics, which measure usage of online scholarly resources, are now available at the article level.

See also
Bibliometrics
Scientometrics

References

Further reading
 
 
 

Academic publishing
Citation metrics